Andrzej Barszczyński (born 26 March 1941) is a Polish film director, screenwriter and camera operator. He is best known as a co-screenwriter for the cult film Rejs (1970).

He was born in Warsaw, Poland. After the Second World War, Barszczyński and his parents moved to Prudnik. He studied at the Adam Mickiewicz High School in Prudnik, Łódź Film School and the American Film Institute in Los Angeles.

Filmography 
 1970: Rejs – co-screenwriter, camera operator
 1972: Kwiat paproci – screenwriter
 1981: Murmurando – director, screenwriter
 1982: Kilka dni na ziemi niczyjej – camera operator
 1983: Incydent na pustyni – camera operator
 1983: Śledztwo porucznika Tomaszka – camera operator
 1984: Fetysz – camera operator
 1985: Okruchy wojny – director, screenwriter
 1987: Dzikun – director, screenwriter
 1989: Ring – director, screenwriter
 1990: Tajemnica puszczy – director, screenwriter

References 

1941 births
Living people
Film people from Warsaw
People from Prudnik
Polish film directors
Polish screenwriters
Łódź Film School alumni
AFI Conservatory alumni